"Dance With Me" is a 1978 international hit single recorded by Peter Brown. It was the second release from his first LP, and became his greatest hit. Backing vocals were provided by Betty Wright along with her girlfriends Patricia Hurley and Wildflower.

In the United States, "Dance With Me" peaked at number eight on the Billboard pop singles chart and number nine in Canada. The song did best in New Zealand, where it reached number three.

Charts

Weekly charts

Year-end charts

Track listing

References

External links
Lyrics of this song
 

1978 singles
1978 songs
Peter Brown (singer) songs
Betty Wright songs
Songs written by Peter Brown (singer)
Disco songs
TK Records singles
Songs about dancing